Janet van de Graaf (born April 5, 1965) is a Canadian improv artist and television actress.

She has worked with Toronto's The Second City and has played various roles in the TV series History Bites on Canada's History Channel.

She is married to actor Bob Martin.  Their namesakes are used as characters in the musical The Drowsy Chaperone, which was originally created for their stag party.

Awards
She has won three Canadian Comedy Awards, for Best Female Improviser (2002 & 2004) and Best Female TV Performance (for History Bites in 2002).

Notes

External link

1965 births
Living people
Canadian women comedians
Canadian television actresses
Improvisational theatre in Canada
Canadian Comedy Award winners